Ignazio Visco  (born 21 November 1949) is an Italian economist and central banker and the current Governor of the Bank of Italy.

Early life and education
Visco was born in Naples on 21 November 1949. He obtained a summa cum laude degree in economics from the Sapienza University of Rome in 1971 with Federico Caffè as supervisor and continued his studies at the University of Pennsylvania (Economics Department), where he obtained an MA in 1974 and a PhD in 1981.

Career
In 1972 Visco began his career at the Bank of Italy and in 1990 he was named head of the research department; from 1997 to 2002 he was chief economist of the Organisation for Economic Co-operation and Development (OECD) and on 9 January 2007 he was named deputy director-general of the Bank of Italy (alongside Giovanni Carosio) and a member of its Direttorio (Board of Directors).

On 24 October 2011 Visco was named to succeed Mario Draghi as governor of the Bank of Italy by Italian President Giorgio Napolitano.

Starting from 1 January 2013, in accordance with Legislative Decree 95/12 (converted into law, with modifications, from Law no.135/2012), he also holds the position of chairman of the joint governing board of the Italian Insurance Supervisory Authority (IVASS).

On 28 January 2015, Ignazio Visco was placed under investigation by the Prosecutor of Spoleto as part a probe into the special administration of Banca Popolare di Spoleto. 
In September 2016, the case was definitively dropped by a judge, upholding the prosecutor's request.

During his time in office, Visco came under fire for failing to effectively tackle Italy's banking woes. In October 2017, the country's ruling centre-left Democratic Party submitted a motion in parliament calling for new leadership at the Bank of Italy, casting doubt on Visco's chances of being reappointed to a second term. Following a proposal made by Prime Minister Paolo Gentiloni and his cabinet to renominate Visco and the endorsement of the Bank of Italy's high council, however, President Sergio Mattarella signed a decree to reappoint Visco for a second six-year term.

Other activities

European Union institutions
 European Systemic Risk Board (ESRB), Ex-Officio Member

International organizations
 Asian Development Bank, ex-officio member of the Board of Governors
 Bank for International Settlements, ex-officio member of the Board of Directors 
 Financial Stability Board, ex-officio member of the steering committee
 Inter-American Development Bank, alternate member of the Board of Governors
 International Monetary Fund (IMF), alternate member of the Board of Governors
 American Economic Association, member
 Joint World Bank-IMF Development Committee, member
 World Bank, ex-officio member of the Board of Governors

Works 
Price Expectations in Rising Inflation, North Holland, 1984
Le aspettative nell'analisi economica, Il Mulino, 1985
Inflazione, concorrenza e sviluppo (with Stefano Micossi), Il Mulino, 1993
Saving and the Accumulation of Wealth (with Albert Ando and Luigi Guiso), Cambridge University Press, 1994
L'economia italiana (with Federico L. Signorini), Il Mulino, 2002
Ageing and Pension System Reform (as Chairman of the G-10 Working Group), 2005 (PDF)
Investire in conoscenza, Il Mulino, 2009

Awards and honors

See also 
 Governor of the Bank of Italy

References

External links 

|-

1949 births
Governors of the Bank of Italy
Italian bankers
Italian economists
Living people
Writers from Naples
Sapienza University of Rome alumni
Wharton School of the University of Pennsylvania alumni